Highland, West Virginia may refer to the following communities:
Highland, Marion County, West Virginia
Highland, Ritchie County, West Virginia